Ville Juhana Haapasalo (born 28 February 1972) is a Finnish stage and film actor who has worked in Finland and Russia. His acting career started in 1995, after he finished his studies in St. Petersburg. In 2003, he was honored with the State Prize of the Russian Federation for his role of Veikko in the film The Cuckoo directed by Aleksandr Rogozhkin.

Education
Haapasalo was educated in St. Petersburg at the Academy of Performing Arts of the Saint Petersburg State Theatre Arts Academy. He knew no Russian when he began studying. He studied there from 1991 to 1995. It was a difficult period in the 1990s Russia; he was mugged nine times in 1992, tried to commit suicide three times, and because of his financial problems he worked as a driver for the mafia.

Career
Haapasalo's career got a huge lift immediately after his graduation for his appearance in 1995 in a Russian comedy Peculiarities of the National Hunt. But this sudden fame turned out to be stressful for him and he temporarily returned to Finland to work as a truck driver. In 2002, he won the Best Actor award at the 24th Moscow International Film Festival, for his role in the Russian-made film The Cuckoo.

Although his fame comes mostly from film, he also writes for the screen, acts in theaters, and does TV cinema. He also appeared in Finland's Ministry of Transport and Communications' 1998 campaign National Features of Driving instructing Russians on Finnish road rules. He is more widely recognized in Russia than in his country of origin Finland. Recently, he has hosted and starred in a number of travel shows on Finnish and Russian TV.

Personal life
Haapasalo was born in Hollola, Finland. He speaks four languages fluently: Finnish, Russian, Swedish, and English. His hobbies include playing trombone, ice-hockey, skiing, and skating.

In 2016, Haapasalo opened a Georgian restaurant called Purpur in Helsinki.

Family 
Ville Haapasalo married Saara Hedlund in 1995 and they currently reside in Helsinki, Finland. Haapasalo and Hedlund have two children. Haapasalo also has a son (born 2009) with director Tina Barkalaja.

Writer
Luonto ja terveys (2006) (TV)
Perjantai (2003) (TV)

Filmography

References

External links

The New York Times Movies

http://www.actors.fi/haapasalo.html
http://www.sonyclassics.com/thecuckoo/core/hasFlash.html

1972 births
Living people
People from Hollola
Finnish male film actors
Finnish male stage actors
Finnish expatriates in Russia
State Prize of the Russian Federation laureates
Russian State Institute of Performing Arts alumni